The Academy of Environmental Science (AES) is a public charter school in Crystal River, Citrus County, Florida, United States, and a part of the Citrus County School District. The Academy is located on Fort Island, near Fort Island Gulf Beach.

SCUBA Program 
AES, in partnership with Crystal River Kayak Company and Dive Center, runs a program which allows for 10th grade HOPE students to receive a NAUI Open Water Scuba certification at a reduced cost. This program has been in place since 2017.

See also
List of high schools in Florida

References

External links

Charter schools in Florida
High schools in Citrus County, Florida
Public high schools in Florida
Crystal River, Florida
1999 establishments in Florida
Educational institutions established in 1999